Strečno is a village and municipality in the Žilina District in the Žilina Region in North Slovakia. It is located by the Váh River in the Malá Fatra Mts. Situated 7 km east from Žilina, Strečno is most famous for its gothic castle ruins.

History
In historical records the village was first mentioned in 1300. 
The castle, built in the beginning 14th century by Matthew III Csák was destroyed in 1698.

During World War II, participants of the Slovak National Uprising and German Army clashed in brutal battles in the gorges of Strečno.

Geography
The municipality lies at an altitude of 360 metres and covers an area of 13.175 km2. It has a population of about 2648 people.

Gallery

References

External links
 Official site
 Pictures of Strečno Castle

Villages and municipalities in Žilina District